The 2006–07 Slovak Cup was the 38th season of Slovakia's annual knock-out cup competition and the fourteenth since the independence of Slovakia. It began on 1 August 2006 with Round 1 and ended on 8 May 2007 with the Final. The winners of the competition earned a place in the First qualifying round of the UEFA Cup. MFK Ružomberok were the defending champions.

First round
The two games were played on 1 August 2006.

 

|}

Second round
The two games were played on 5 September 2006, the twelve games on 12 and 13 September 2006 and the two games were played on 10 October 2006.

|}

Third round
The seven games were played on 24 and 25 October 2006 and the match Artmedia Bratislava – Rimavská Sobota was played on 7 November 2006.

|}

Quarter-finals
The match Artmedia Bratislava – MŠK Žilina was played on 3 April 2007 and the three games were played on 4 April 2007.

|}

Semi-finals
The first legs were played on 17 April 2007. The second legs were played on 25 April 2007.

|}

Final

References

External links
profutbal.sk 
Results on RSSSF

Slovak Cup seasons
Cup
Slovak Cup